The Argentina–England football rivalry is a highly competitive sports rivalry that exists between the national football teams of the two countries, as well as their respective sets of fans. Games between the two teams, even those that are only friendly matches, are often marked by notable and sometimes controversial incidents.

The rivalry is unusual in that it is an intercontinental one; typically such footballing rivalries exist between countries that are close to one another, for example France–Italy or Argentina–Brazil. England is regarded in Argentina as one of the major rivals of the national football team, matched only by Brazil, Germany and Uruguay. The rivalry is seen as equal in England, partly due to non-footballing events, especially the 1982 Falklands War between Argentina and the United Kingdom.

The rivalry emerged across several games during the second half of the twentieth century. It was driven by various controversial incidents, particularly those in the games played between the teams at the 1966 and 1986 FIFA World Cups.

Overall, England hold the edge in the rivalry in official matches, with six victories to two by Argentina, and five draws (one draw being an Argentina victory by penalty shoot-out). In the World Cup, England also lead Argentina in their head-to-head record, with three victories (in 1962, 1966 and 2002) to Argentina's one (1986, in addition to their 1998 shoot-out victory).

Early history

British influence on Argentine football 

In the latter half of the 19th century, the Argentine capital Buenos Aires had a large expatriate British community of some 10,000 people. As in many other parts of the world, football was introduced to Argentina by the British. The first recorded football match played in Argentina was organized by the Buenos Aires Cricket Club in Palermo, Buenos Aires, on 20 June 1867, and played between two teams of British railway workers, the White Caps and the Red Caps<ref>[https://www.rsssf.org/tablesa/arg-early-info.html "Early History of Football in Argentina'"] – RSSSF</ref> (it was common in the early days of football for teams to be distinguished by caps rather than jerseys).

The so-called "father of Argentine football" was a Glaswegian schoolteacher, Alexander Watson Hutton, who first taught football at the St. Andrew's Scots School in Buenos Aires in the early 1880s. On 4 February 1884, he founded the Buenos Aires English High School, where he continued to instruct the pupils in the game. In 1898, Alumni Athletic Club, a football team formed by the BAEHS students, was established. Alumni would be the most successful team of Argentina, winning a total of 22 titles until it was dissolved in 1913. Moreover, Alumni also became the first local team to defeat a British side, South Africa (mostly composed of British–origin players) 1–0 at Sociedad Sportiva Argentina, which set up a landmark in Argentine football.

In 1891, Hutton established the Association Argentine Football League. Five clubs competed but only one season of games was played. A new league, The Argentine Association Football League, was formed 21 February 1893 and would eventually become the Argentine Football Association (AFA). In these early days of football in Argentina, nearly all of the players and officials were expatriate Britons or of British extraction, and the oldest football clubs in Argentina such as Rosario Central, Newell's Old Boys and Quilmes A.C., were all founded by British expatriates.

In the 20th century, several British football clubs tours to South America contributed to the spread and develop of football in the region. The first club to tour on the region was Southampton in 1904, followed by several teams (mainly from England although some Scottish clubs also visited South America) until 1929 with Chelsea being the last team to tour.

During those 25 years of tours, British teams' performances were decreasing while the South American squads' style of playing improved. Indeed, Southampton won all of their matches in 1904 with 40 goals scored in 1904 while Chelsea was defeated eight times (over 16 games played) in their 1929 tour.

As the popularity of the game increased, the British influence on the game waned and by 1912, the Association was renamed "Asociación del Fútbol Argentino". The British influence on the game in Argentina, however, shows in the continued use of terms such as "corner" and "wing" rather than their Spanish translations. The names of several famous teams in Argentina are also English in origin, such as River Plate, or influenced by the language, such as Boca Juniors, due to the British prevalence on the sport and the mandatory use of English language.

In the 1940s the Argentine Football Association used English referees in its competitions.

 First matches 

The national teams had met before their 1966 clash – Argentina were the first team other than Scotland to play England at Wembley Stadium in 1951 when the inaugural full international match between the sides ended with a 2–1 victory for England. They also played two matches in 1953 in Buenos Aires. The first, a 3–1 victory for Argentina, was considered an unofficial international by England, who fielded a second-string team dubbed an FA XI. Although this match appears in some records citing Argentina's list of official internationals, it is not listed as a full international by either the AFA or FIFA. Nevertheless, the Argentines consider it to be their first ever victory over England. Afterwards, one Argentine politician stated that "we nationalised the railways, and now we have nationalised football!"

The second 1953 international was an official match for both teams: England playing with a stronger line-up involving Alf Ramsey, Nat Lofthouse and Tom Finney; Argentina sticking with the same line-up used in the first match. The game, however, was abandoned after 23 minutes due to torrential rain, with a 0–0 scoreline. The match also set a record of 91,000 spectators, the highest attendance for a football match until then. Argentina and England next met in the 1962 FIFA World Cup in Chile, where England's 3–1 victory in the group stage led to Argentina's exit from the tournament. Argentina's first victory over England in a full international occurred in a 1–0 win in June 1964, during the Taça das Nações friendly tournament in Brazil.

Crucial moments

1966 World Cup
In spite of all of this history, it was not until the 1966 FIFA World Cup, held in and eventually won by England, that the rivalry picked up the sometimes bitter and fierce edge that it retains. The two teams met in the quarter-finals of the tournament, a game referred to in Argentina as el robo del siglo ("the theft of the century")
that England won 1–0 thanks to a goal from striker Geoff Hurst, disputed by the Argentines due to a claimed offside.

The game, however, was particularly noted for the sending off of Argentina captain Antonio Rattín after receiving his second caution of the game. The Argentines considered the second caution to be unfair, including Rattín himself, who had to be escorted from the pitch by police as he refused to leave the pitch. Rattín was cautioned at the start of the match for a lunge on Bobby Charlton. Rattín then fouled Geoff Hurst and received another caution (the use of yellow/red cards would not be adopted until the next World Cup in Mexico) for arguing with the referee for a teammate's foul.

It was reported in Argentina that the German referee, Rudolf Kreitlein, said that he had sent off Rattín because he did not like how he had looked at him, while British newspapers cited the official as having given the reason as "violence of the tongue", despite the referee speaking no Spanish. Rattín's intention appeared to have been to speak with the German referee, as according to the Argentines, he was ruling in favour of the English team. Rattín made a visible signal showing his captain's armband and intention to call a translator.

Ken Aston, the English supervisor of referees, entered the field to try to persuade Rattín to leave, but he only exacerbated the situation since the Latin American teams had already suspected that the English and Germans were collaborating to eliminate them from the competition. After his dismissal, Rattín scrunched the corner flag (featuring the Union Jack) with his hand before finally sitting down on the ground. After the match, England manager Alf Ramsey refused to allow his players to swap shirts with the Argentines (as is traditional after the conclusion of a major football match) and later described the South Americans as "animals" in the press. The Argentine press and public were outraged, and one Argentine newspaper published a picture of the official World Cup mascot, World Cup Willie, dressed in pirate regalia to demonstrate their opinion of the England team.

1986 World Cup

The rivalry between the sides continued in friendlies in 1974, 1977 and 1980. The match at Wembley in 1974 was officiated by an Argentinian referee, who awarded the away side a penalty in the last five minutes that Mario Kempes converted to secure a 2–2 draw. In Buenos Aires in June 1977, a 1–1 draw between the teams was marred by a punch by Daniel Bertoni on Trevor Cherry that resulted in both players being sent off. England beat Argentina 3–1 at Wembley in a less contentious match in 1980 that marked Diego Maradona's first appearance against England.

The next competitive game between the two teams occurred at the 1986 World Cup in Mexico, again at the quarter-final stage. The encounter was made particularly incendiary by the 1982 Falklands War fought between the Argentine Republic and the United Kingdom four years previously, and many in Argentina saw the game as being an opportunity to exact revenge upon England for England's part in the conflict.

Argentina took the lead through a highly controversial goal from Maradona, who punched the ball into the net with his hand. The goal was allowed to stand by the Tunisian referee Ali Bin Nasser, much to the fury of the English team and its fans. The goal, dubbed the "Hand of God goal" after Maradona's tongue-in-cheek description of how it was scored, has become infamous in England, particularly as England went on to lose the game and Argentina later won the tournament.

Also in this game, Maradona scored a second goal, voted in 2002 as the best goal in World Cup history, before English striker Gary Lineker pulled one back, but England could not score again and lost 2–1. Despite the skill of his second goal, Maradona wrote in his autobiography that "I sometimes think I preferred the one with my hand ... It was a bit like stealing the wallet of the English." He also wrote, in reference to the Falklands conflict, that "it was as if we had beaten a country, not just a football team ... Although we had said before the game that football had nothing to do with the Falkland Islands war, we knew they had killed a lot of Argentine boys there, killed them like little birds. And this was revenge."

At the end of the game, England's Steve Hodge swapped shirts with Maradona, and later sold the shirt at auction for £7.1million. Maradona praised the English as they did not use rough tactics like the other teams that frequently fouled and knocked him over.

The game added hugely to the rivalry between the two teams in England where they felt that they had been cheated out of the competition by Maradona's handball. The importance of both goals for the English people can be seen as the fact they were chosen sixth in the list of 100 Greatest Sporting Moments in 2002 by Channel 4. Meanwhile, in Argentina, the game was seen as revenge for the Falklands War and for what they still see as the unfair game in the 1966 World Cup.

1991 friendly

On 25 May 1991, a friendly match between the two teams was played at Wembley. Argentina, now under the management of Alfio Basile, were preparing for the forthcoming Copa América 1991, which they went on to win. The South Americans had a new generation of players mainly playing locally, replacing the very successful group of the previous two World Cup tournaments. The game was mostly under the control of England, but near the end, Argentina came back from two goals down to draw 2–2. Claudio García and Darío Franco scored with headers.

Despite not being a victory, the result was celebrated in Argentina, especially as both Argentine goals came from corner kicks, which in Argentina were seen as being a part of the game at which the English usually excelled.

1998 World Cup
The next meeting between the two countries came in the round of 16 of the 1998 FIFA World Cup, held in Saint-Étienne, France. The game had many noteworthy aspects including a goal that is considered to be one of England's greatest ever goals, scored by young striker Michael Owen.

The match is also remembered for David Beckham receiving a red card. Beckham had been fouled by Diego Simeone and as Simeone stood up, he rubbed his knuckles against the back of Beckham's head as Beckham lay face-down on the pitch. Lying on the floor, Beckham swung his leg at Simeone, after which Simeone fell over, and the referee sent Beckham off.

Playing with ten men, England held out against the Argentine attacks and, in the dying moments of the game during a scramble in the Argentine penalty area, Sol Campbell headed the ball into the goal. As the England players began to celebrate a winning goal, the referee blew for a foul that Alan Shearer had committed on the Argentine goalkeeper prior to the goal and disallowed it. The consequent free kick was taken very quickly, while the England players were still celebrating, and they had to rush back to prevent the Argentines from scoring.

The scores stayed level at 2–2 until the end of extra time. In the ensuing penalty shoot-out that decided the game, Argentina won 4–3 after two English kicks were saved by their goalkeeper Carlos Roa.

Immediately following the game, Beckham was vilified by the English press for his perceived petulance and naïvety on the international stage; the headline in The Daily Mirror the following day described the England team as: "10 Heroic Lions, One Stupid Boy", Simeone has since made a subsequent "confession" where he admitted to simulating the injury from the kick in order to get Beckham sent off, and as all his teammates urged the referee to give Beckham the red card. However, Sports Illustrated was critical of the Argentines' theatrics in that event, stating that Simeone first delivered a "heavy-handed challenge" on Beckham and then "fell like a ton of bricks" to get Beckham sent off, noting that the Argentines used similar "theatrics" in their next match against the Netherlands which got a Dutch player sent off (however, Argentina lost that match 2–1).

2002 World Cup
Another friendly was played in 2000, again at Wembley, but ended 0–0. Then, the teams were drawn to meet once more in the group stage of the 2002 FIFA World Cup. Having been knocked out by Argentina in two of the previous three World Cups in which they had competed, tension in England was high. This tension was raised by the England team, gaining only a draw in their opening match against Sweden, meaning that they needed a good result against Argentina to avoid being eliminated from the competition.

David Beckham, who was then the England captain, scored the only goal of the match, a penalty kick following a foul on Michael Owen by Mauricio Pochettino, which many felt redeemed Beckham in the eyes of the English sporting public for his dismissal four years earlier. As The Times described it in their match report, "vilified for the red card that helped to usher England out of the 1998 World Cup at the hands of Argentina, he wakes this morning with his halo brighter than ever." Despite a late onslaught from the Argentine players at the end of the second half of the game, England maintained the scoreline and won 1–0, and partly as a result of this Argentina (one of the pre-tournament favourites to win) were knocked out in the first round. 

Although the Argentine players and public criticised the awarding of the penalty kick, the game was generally played in a good, if highly competitive, spirit, and there was none of the bitterness that had affected the 1966, 1986 and 1998 meetings. Diego Simeone and David Beckham, whose clash in the 1998 meeting had resulted in Beckham's sending-off, shook hands in the middle of the game.

As expected, Argentine fans were extremely disappointed with the result of this match and the subsequent draw with Sweden. A new "controversy" developed among the fans in the aftermath of the game when it was claimed that Argentine captain Juan Sebastián Verón had purposely diminished the quality of his game, because he had to return to England to play with Manchester United. Verón has denied the allegations.

2005 friendly
The most recent game between the two nations occurred on neutral ground in Geneva on 12 November 2005 when the two teams, having both already qualified for the 2006 FIFA World Cup, met in a friendly. Both teams selected strong sides. England twice came from behind to beat Argentina 3–2 with goals from Michael Owen from crosses by Steven Gerrard and Joe Cole in the dying moments. The result and performance were welcomed enthusiastically by the English press and public. The general nature of the match was also less intensely vitriolic than on previous occasions, with The Times reporting, "by the unpleasant standards of previous confrontations, the skirmish between England and Argentina edged towards the saccharine, although the concept is deeply relative. The latest encounter featured punches on the terraces, songs about the Falkland Islands, jibes regarding players' sexuality and general churlishness that, believe it or not, represents a significant thaw in diplomatic relations." England's victory was the first time either side had won consecutive matches against the other.

 List of matches 
Below is a list of matches between the countries:England national team matches on England Football OnlineEl partido del gol de Grillo on El Gráfico

Notes

 Matches overview 

Notes

Facts and figures
 In Argentina (2 matches): 1 draw, 1 abandonment
 In England (6 matches): 3 England wins, 3 draws
 Neutral venues (6 matches): 3 England wins, 2 Argentina wins, 1 draw (Argentina won on penalties)
 Both teams have knocked each other out on the way to winning World Cups – England in 1966 and Argentina in 1986.

Club level
At the club level, matches have also been heated. Argentine and English clubs have not had many chances to play against each other, but when they have done so there have been notable incidents. The most memorable matches happened in the now defunct European/South American Cup. In 1968, Estudiantes de La Plata played against Manchester United for the Cup, then known as the "Intercontinental Cup". The first leg was in Buenos Aires, where Estudiantes' supporters were highly vocal and the game was played in a very physical manner with a disputed red card and physical injury. Manchester United could not recover the 1–0 deficit in the second leg and Estudiantes won the title.

Nine years later, in 1977, Liverpool refused to play against Boca Juniors, so Boca played against European runner-up Borussia Mönchengladbach and obtained their first cup. In 1978, Liverpool alleged "scheduling conflicts"; the cup was not played.

During the 1978 European tour of River Plate, the Argentine team achieved a 2–1 victory over Sheffield United. The match was played at Bramall Lane as part of the transfer of Alejandro Sabella to the English club.

In 1984, Independiente played Liverpool for the trophy that, by this point, had been renamed the "Toyota Cup". The format had also changed, to a single game played in Japan, making it easier for teams to attend. Independiente won 1–0 with a goal by José Percudani.

At the 2007 Peace Cup (held in Japan) between Argentine side River Plate and English club Reading, the game ended in a 1–0 win for the Argentines. Likewise at the 2009 Edmonton Cup in Canada, River Plate defeated Everton 1–0 with a goal scored by Ariel Ortega.

The most recent match between an English and Argentine club was between Arsenal and Boca Juniors in July 2011, a friendly staged in London as part of the annual Emirates Cup.

Fans' behaviour
Much of the colour and intensity in this rivalry is added by the fans themselves. While matches prior to the 1982 Falklands War generated interest and emotion, it was the war itself that fuelled passions and elevated this rivalry. Before the 1986 game fans from both countries had a fight in the Mexico City streets  and into the stadium, which included English flags stolen by the Argentine fans and English fans being injured by attacks from the Argentine barras bravas''.

During games, however, behaviour so far has been generally peaceful on both sides; probably because of the heightened security in the stadia.

See also
 History of rugby union matches between Argentina and England
 Argentina–United Kingdom relations

References

External links

England v Argentina: A history 19.05.02.
England v Argentina revisited 29.03.02
A comprehensive list of the results of matches between Argentina and England from 1951 to 2005
Match report — Argentina 2–2 England (Argentina win 4–3 on penalties) 30.06.98
Match report — Argentina 0–1 England 17.06.02
Match report — Argentina 2–3 England 12.11.05

International association football rivalries
England
England national football team rivalries
Argentina–United Kingdom relations
England at the 1966 FIFA World Cup
England at the 1986 FIFA World Cup
England at the 1998 FIFA World Cup
England at the 2002 FIFA World Cup
Argentina at the 1966 FIFA World Cup
Argentina at the 1986 FIFA World Cup
Argentina at the 1998 FIFA World Cup
Argentina at the 2002 FIFA World Cup